The 2015–16 season is Sunderland's 137th season in existence, and their ninth consecutive season in the Premier League. Along with competing in the Premier League, the club also participated in the FA Cup and League Cup. The season covers the period from 1 July 2015 to 30 June 2016. On May 11 2016, Sunderland confirmed a tenth consecutive Premier League season with a 3–0 victory over Everton at the Stadium of Light. Simultaneously, the result confirmed the relegation of arch-rivals Newcastle.

Squad

First Team Squad

 U21 = Under-21 player

New contracts

Transfers and Loans

Transfers In

Total Spending:  £39,750,000

Loans In

Transfers Out

Total Received:  £15,500,000

Loans Out

Pre-season friendlies
On 26 May 2015, Sunderland announced two pre-season friendly against Darlington 1883 and Doncaster Rovers. On 5 June 2015, a tour of the United States and Canada was announced. On 23 June 2015, an exhibition match against Hannover 96 was announced to be played in Germany.

Competitions

Overall

Overview

Goalscorers

Clean Sheets 
Includes all competitive matches. The list is sorted alphabetically by surname when total clean sheets are equal.

Correct as of match played on 11 May 2016

Disciplinary record

Overall summary

Summary

Score overview

References

Sunderland
Sunderland A.F.C. seasons